Ioan Gherhard (born 26 February 1942), also spelled Ioan Gerhard, is a Romanian professional handball manager best known for winning the IHF Cup and the IHF Super Cup with Chimistul Râmnicu Vâlcea. Internationally, Gherhard also led men's team Selmont Baia Mare to the final in the 2002–03 Challenge Cup. He is nicknamed "Geri".

Trophies

Women's 
Chimistul Râmnicu Vâlcea
Liga Națională:
Winner: 1989

IHF Cup:
Winner: 1989

IHF Super Cup:
Winner: 1984

Men's
Minaur Baia Mare
Liga Națională:
Winner: 1998

References

 
  
1942 births  
Romanian handball coaches  
Romanian expatriate sportspeople in Greece
Living people